The first lady of the Republic of Turkey is the wife of the president of Turkey.

Officeholders

See also 
 Turkey
 President of Turkey
 First Lady

 
Turkey, President
Lists of Turkish people